Thorpeness is a seaside village in the East Suffolk district of Suffolk, England, which developed in the early 20th century into an exclusive holiday village. It belongs to the parish of Aldringham cum Thorpe and lies within the Suffolk Coast and Heaths AONB.

Development
For the earlier history of Thorpe, see Aldringham-cum-Thorpe.

The village was a small fishing hamlet originating in the late 19th century, with folk tales of it being a route for smugglers into East Anglia. However in 1910, Glencairn Stuart Ogilvie, a Scottish barrister whose father had made a fortune building railways around the world, increased the family's local estates to cover the entire area from north of Aldeburgh to past Sizewell, up the coast and inland to Aldringham and Leiston.

Most of this land was used for farming, but Ogilvie developed Thorpeness into an elite private fantasy holiday village, to which he invited his friends' and colleagues' families during the summer months. An exclusive country club with tennis courts, a swimming pool, clubhouse; a golf club designed by the eminent James Braid with its own club house; and many holiday homes were built in Jacobean and Tudor Revival styles. Thorpeness railway station, provided by the Great Eastern Railway to serve what was expected to be an expanding resort, was opened a few days before the outbreak of World War I. It was little used, except by golfers, and closed in 1966.

A notable feature of the village is a set of almshouses built in the 1920s to the design of W. G. Wilson. To hide the eyesore of having a water tower in the village, the tank built in 1923 was clad in wood to make it look like a small house on top of a five-storey tower, with a separate mill next to it, which pumped water to it. It is known as the "House in the Clouds", and after mains water was installed in the village, the old tank was transformed into a huge games room with views over the land from Aldeburgh to Sizewell.

For three generations Thorpeness remained mostly in the private ownership of the Ogilvie family, with houses only being sold from the estate to friends as holiday homes. In 1972, Alexander Stuart Ogilvie, Glencairn Stuart Ogilvie's grandson, died on the Thorpeness Golf Course. Many of the houses and the golf course and country club had to be sold to pay death duties.

The Meare
An artificial boating lake known as the Meare was created where there had once been an Elizabethan shipping haven that had silted up. Many of the inspirations for the Meare came from a personal friend of the Ogilvies, J. M. Barrie, who wrote Peter Pan. Along with a large main pond, there are several channels with landings marked with names from the Peter Pan stories. Tiny islands on the Meare contain locations found in the novel, such as the pirates' lair, Wendy's house, and many others, where children are encouraged to play. The Meare was dug to a shallow depth for safety reasons.

A variety of boats can be rented to enjoy the water, many of them originals dating from the creation of the Meare and named by the local workmen who had dug the lake.

The Thurstons (who were the boatman at the time) named many of the boats after local girls and family members. In recent times some boats have been donated in memory of people, for example Valma and Martha.

In August, the Meare serves as the location for the Thorpeness Regatta, which is usually held about the same time as the carnival in neighbouring Aldeburgh and attracts many visitors. During the day, there are boat races, and at night, boats that have been decorated are paraded around the Meare. This is followed by a fireworks display.

Thorpeness today

Thorpeness is a quiet village of about 400 people in the winter, increasing to over 1,600 in the summer holiday season. It is considered the Suffolk equivalent of Saint-Jean-Cap-Ferrat, Nantucket, Mustique and, in particular, given they are also the creations of one man: Port Grimaud near St Tropez and Portro Cervo/Costa Smeralda. Apart from events centred on the Meare at the end of August, it is also popular with day trippers, for its beach, amenities, and sights such as The House in the Clouds.

The landowning Ogilvie family, who began to buy into the area in 1859, still have a strong presence. Many of those holidaying in the village have been doing so for generations. Many families of craftsmen who helped to build the village still live there.

To the south of the village lies the North Warren RSPB reserve, an area of wildlife and habitat conservation and nature trails run by the Royal Society for the Protection of Birds. It has Site of Special Scientific Interest (SSSI) and Special Protection Area (SPA) status.

Like much of the East Coast, Thorpeness has had intermittent problems with erosion. Discussions are still underway for further defences.

In popular culture
A lifeboat crew from Thorpeness rescues Tim and his friend the sea captain in the Edward Ardizzone book Little Tim and the Brave Sea Captain (1936), and are awarded medals for heroism by the Lord Mayor.

The Second World War
Radar: A radar installation was located in Thorpeness, Chain Home Extra Low Station K164.
Coastal artillery: a lone 18-pounder field gun was sited in a concrete gun emplacement on the cliffs of Thorpeness. The gun was given the name John, while others elsewhere on the coast were named Matthew, Mark, Luke and St Peter.
Anti-aircraft artillery.
 fell victim to a mine and sank close inshore off Thorpeness.
In the run-up to the Second World War, a small British merchant vessel named Thorpeness was sunk by a torpedo fired by German forces off Spain.
An anti-tank ditch ran from Aldringham to the Meare. This was dug by the 9th Battalion of the Cameronians.
One regiment of the 1st Assault Brigade Royal Engineers arrived in Thorpeness in late 1943 and was stationed there.
A detachment of 2711 Squadron, RAF Regiment, was stationed in Thorpeness, as was 2783 Squadron RAF Regiment.
The Archaeological Service of Suffolk County Council produced a detailed report of the Second World War and other archaeological aspects of Thorpeness.

References

External links

Thorpeness village
Photographs and more details about Thorpeness
Information about conservation work carried out in this Area of Outstanding Natural Beauty
Panoramic views along Thorpeness beach and of The Meare

Seaside resorts in England
Villages in Suffolk
Populated coastal places in Suffolk
Beaches of Suffolk